Lokhvitsy is a rural locality (a selo) and the administrative center of Lokhvitsky Selsoviet of Belogorsky District, Amur Oblast, Russia. The population was 589 as of 2018. There are 9 streets.

Geography 
Lokhvitsy is located 36 km southwest of Belogorsk (the district's administrative centre) by road. Savelyevka is the nearest rural locality.

References 

Rural localities in Belogorsky District